This is the list of annual winners of the Detroit Film Critics Society Award for Best Use of Music

2010s
Sources:

2017:Baby Driver
Blade Runner 2049
Good Time
Phantom Thread
The Shape of Water
2018:A Star Is Born
Bohemian Rhapsody
Green Book
Mandy
Mary Poppins Returns
2019:Once Upon a Time in Hollywood
1917
Rocketman
Uncut Gems
Wild Rose

2020s
Sources:

2020:Sound of Metal
News of the World
Possessor
Soul
Tenet

See also
Academy Award for Best Original Score

References

Detroit Film Critics Society Awards
Awards established in 2017